Gaby Joseph Saliba is a Lebanese fashion designer and hairdresser, noted for his elegant wedding costumes in his range called Gaby Saliba Haute Couture. He owns the fashion house Anfeh in El Koura in northern Lebanon. Saliba's garments regularly feature in women's fashion magazines across the Arab world, including on the cover of Issue 38 of CHOC magazine. In March 2011 he appeared on MTV Lebanon in Window Weddings, discussing his range.

References

External links
Official site
Video
Photograph of a Gaby Saliba billboard in Beirut
Lebanon Weddings Hairdressers A list of hairdressers in Lebanon
Lebanon Weddings Gowns A list of wedding gowns services in Lebanon

Lebanese fashion designers
Hairdressers
Living people
Wedding dress designers
Year of birth missing (living people)